Perrottet is a French surname. It most commonly refers to Dominic Perrottet (born 1982), an Australian politician and the incumbent 46th Premier of New South Wales.

Other notable people with the surname include:

 Eileen Perrottet (1917–1973), Australian physiotherapist
 George Samuel Perrottet (1793–1870), botanist and horticulturalist

French-language surnames